Basinsk is a rural locality (a settlement) in Basinsky Selsoviet, Limansky District, Astrakhan Oblast, Russia. The population was 456 as of 2010. There are 3 streets.

Geography 
Basinsk is located 49 km north of Liman (the district's administrative centre) by road. Basinskaya is the nearest rural locality.

References 

Rural localities in Limansky District